Barbuti is an Italian surname. Notable people with the surname include:

Massimo Barbuti (born 1958), Italian footballer and manager
Ray Barbuti (1905–1988), American football player and sprinter
Riccardo Barbuti (born 1992), Italian footballer

Italian-language surnames